Golf at the 2017 Summer Deaflympics in Samsun was held at the Samsun Golf Course in Atakum from 21 to 26 July 2017.

Medal summary

Medalists

Participating nations

References

External links
 Golf

2017 Summer Deaflympics
2017 in golf